Üçköy can refer to:

 Üçköy, Çorum
 Üçköy, Zonguldak